These are the official results of the Men's 20 km Walk at the 1992 Summer Olympics in Barcelona, Spain, held on July 31, 1992. There were a total number of 42 competitors, with five athletes who were disqualified.

Medalists

Abbreviations
All times shown are in hours:minutes:seconds

Records

Final ranking

See also
 1990 Men's European Championships 20 km Walk (Split)
 1991 Men's World Championships 20 km Walk (Tokyo)
 1992 Race Walking Year Ranking
 1993 Men's World Championships 20 km Walk (Stuttgart)

References

External links
 Official Report
 Results

W
Racewalking at the Olympics
Men's events at the 1992 Summer Olympics